Ronald Gallegos (born 6 September 1982) is a retired Bolivian football midfielder.

References

1982 births
Living people
Sportspeople from Cochabamba
Bolivian footballers
Universitario de Sucre footballers
Club Real Potosí players
Club Aurora players
Club Petrolero players
Nacional Potosí players
Bolivian Primera División players
Association football midfielders